The Kingston to Montego Bay railway was the main railway in Jamaica, which from 1845 to 1992 linked the capital Kingston with the second city Montego Bay, passing en route most of the major towns.

Construction, operation and closure

An   extension from Spanish Town to Old Harbour was added in 1869 at a cost of £60,000.

A further  extension from Old Harbour to Porus was added in 1885 at a cost of around £187,000.

The final  from Porus to Montego Bay was completed in 1895.

Much of the line closed in October 1992 when all passenger traffic on Jamaica's railways abruptly ceased. Some sections remain in use for bauxite and aluminium freight while the section from Montego Bay to the Appleton Estate remained open for a while as a tourist attraction.

Gradients and curvature

From here the line ran on the level across the Appleton Plain to Maggotty and the start of a climb to  near Stonehenge. Another level section brought it to Long Hill Tunnel and the final descent into Montego Bay.

Stations and Halts
There were 22 stations and 17 halts:

Tunnels
There are 13 tunnels on the line:

Bridges
There were 51 significant bridges and one viaduct on the line

 Trench Town Gully
 Shoemakers Gully
 Cockfight Bridge (gully)
 Salt River
 Rio Cobre
 Irrigation canal east
 Irrigation canal west
 Creek Town Gully
 Track (rail over)
 Irrigation canal
 Cut Throat Gully
 Spring Garden River
 Irrigation canal east 
 Irrigation canal west
 Coleburns Gully
 Church Pen Gully east
 Church Pen Gully west
 Stony Gully
 Fraser's Gully
 Old Harbour(?) River
 Bowers Gully
 Palmetto Gully
 Hunts Pen road (rail over)
 A2 road (rail under)
 Rio Minho - originally completed in 1874, it was completely rebuilt during the second decade of the twentieth century by Hewson (of the Jamaica Government Railway) using the then new method of concrete blocks
 Jacks or St Annes Gully #1
 Jacks or St Annes Gully #2
 Jacks or St Annes Gully #3
 Jacks or St Annes Gully #4
 Flemings (sic) Gully east
 Flemings (sic) Gully west
 Milk River
 Milk River (seasonal)
 Track (rail over)
 Kendal - Mandeville road (rail over)
 B6 road, Balaclava (rail under)
 Black River #1
 Black River #2
 Black River #3  
 Ipswich - Merrywood road (rail under)
 Richmond Hill road (rail under)
 B6 road, Jubilee (rail under)
 Seven River #1
 Seven River #2
 Seven River #3
 Seven River #4
 Seven River #5
 Browns River
 Anchovy Gully
 B8 road, Mount Carey (rail under)
 Bogue Viaduct
 Montego River

Junctions
There were three branch line junctions, three railway works junctions and four estate railway junctions on the line:

Branch lines
Spanish Town Junction to Bog Walk, Ewarton, New Works and Port Antonio
May Pen Junction to Frankfield
Logans Junction to Fort Simmonds

Railway works
 Kingston railway workshops
 Kingston permanent way department
 Kingston engine sheds

Estate railways
 Caymanas estate
 Bridge Pen
 Raheen
 Appleton

Bauxite lines
 Bodles

Piers
 Kingston railway piers numbers 1, 2 & 3

Notes and references

External links
Montego Bay to Williamsfield, Jamaica, 7 minute black and white silent film shot from the rear of a moving train, SINTZENICH, Hal & WEDDUP, Charlie, Kineto, 1913, Colonial Film: Moving Images of the British Empire.
 Advertisement for shares in the railway published in the Railway Register in Britain in 1845

Railway lines opened in 1845
Standard gauge railways in Jamaica
Railway lines closed in 1992